CommaFeed is a free and open source feed reader. It is a web application which can be self hosted on a web server or used through commafeed.com. It has responsive design supporting desktop, tablet and mobile browser simultaneously. An Android News+ client was available  but discontinued. It supports right-to-left feeds.

References

External links 
 
 CommaFeed sourcecode hosted on GitHub

Free and open-source Android software
Free software programmed in Java (programming language)
Cross-platform free software
News aggregators